In physics, naturalness is the aesthetic property that the dimensionless ratios between free parameters or physical constants appearing in a physical theory should take values "of order 1" and that free parameters are not fine-tuned. That is, a natural theory would have parameter ratios with values like 2.34 rather than 234000 or 0.000234.

The requirement that satisfactory theories should be "natural" in this sense is a current of thought initiated around the 1960s in particle physics. It is a criterion that arises from the seeming non-naturalness of the standard model and the broader topics of the hierarchy problem, fine-tuning, and the anthropic principle. However it does tend to suggest a possible area of weakness or future development for current theories such as the Standard Model, where some parameters vary by many orders of magnitude, and which require extensive "fine-tuning" of their current values of the models concerned. The concern is that it is not yet clear whether these seemingly exact values we currently recognize, have arisen by chance (based upon the anthropic principle or similar) or whether they arise from a more advanced theory not yet developed, in which these turn out to be expected and well-explained, because of other factors not yet part of particle physics models.

The concept of naturalness is not always compatible with Occam's razor, since many instances of "natural" theories have more parameters than "fine-tuned" theories such as the Standard Model. Naturalness in physics is closely related to the issue of fine-tuning, and over the past decade many scientists argued that the principle of naturalness is a specific application of Bayesian statistics.

In the history of particle physics, the naturalness principle has given correct predictions three times - in the case of electron self-energy, pion mass difference and kaon mass difference.

Overview

A simple example:

Suppose a physics model requires four parameters which allow it to produce a very high quality working model, calculations, and predictions of some aspect of our physical universe. Suppose we find through experiments that the parameters have values:

 1.2
 1.31
 0.9 and 
 404,331,557,902,116,024,553,602,703,216.58 (roughly 4 x 1029).

We might wonder how such figures arise. But in particular we might be especially curious about a theory where three values are close to one, and the fourth is so different; in other words, the huge disproportion we seem to find between the first three parameters and the fourth. We might also wonder, if these values represent the strengths of forces and one force is so much larger than the others that it needs a factor of 4 x 1029 to allow it to be related to them in terms of effects, how did our universe come to be so exactly balanced when its forces emerged. In current particle physics the differences between some parameters are much larger than this, so the question is even more noteworthy.

One answer given by some physicists is the anthropic principle. If the universe came to exist by chance, and perhaps vast numbers of other universes exist or have existed, then life capable of physics experiments only arose in universes that by chance had very balanced forces. All the universes where the forces were not balanced, didn't develop life capable of the question. So if a lifeform like human beings asks such a question, it must have arisen in a universe having balanced forces, however rare that might be. So when we look, that is what we would expect to find, and what we do find.

A second answer is that perhaps there is a deeper understanding of physics, which, if we discovered and understood it, would make clear these aren't really fundamental parameters and there is a good reason why they have the exact values we have found, because they all derive from other more fundamental parameters that are not so unbalanced.

Introduction
In particle physics, the assumption of naturalness means that, unless a more detailed explanation exists, all conceivable terms in the effective action that preserve the required symmetries should appear in this effective action with natural coefficients.

In an effective field theory,  is the cutoff scale, an energy or length scale at which the theory breaks down.  Due to dimensional analysis, natural coefficients have the form

Some parameters in the effective action of the Standard Model seem to have far smaller coefficients than required by consistency with the assumption of naturalness, leading to some of the fundamental open questions in physics. In particular:

 The naturalness of the QCD "theta parameter" leads to the strong CP problem, because it is very small (experimentally consistent with "zero") rather than of order of magnitude unity.
 The naturalness of the Higgs mass leads to the hierarchy problem, because it is 17 orders of magnitude smaller than the Planck mass that characterizes gravity. (Equivalently, the Fermi constant characterizing the strength of the weak force is very large compared to the gravitational constant characterizing the strength of gravity.)
 The naturalness of the cosmological constant leads to the cosmological constant problem because it is at least 40 and perhaps as much as 100 or more orders of magnitude smaller than naively expected.

In addition, the coupling of the electron to the Higgs, the mass of the electron, is abnormally small, and to a lesser extent, the masses of the light quarks.

In models with large extra dimensions, the assumption of naturalness is violated for operators which multiply field operators that create objects which are localized at different positions in the extra dimensions.

Naturalness and the gauge hierarchy problem

A more practical definition of naturalness is that for any observable  which consists of  independent contributions

Otherwise, if one contribution, say , then some other independent contribution would have to be fine-tuned to a large opposite-sign value
such as to maintain  at its measured value. Such fine-tuning is regarded as unnatural and indicative of some missing ingredient in the theory.

For instance, in the Standard Model with Higgs potential given by

the physical Higgs boson mass is calculated to be

where the quadratically divergent radiative correction is given by

where  is the top-quark Yukawa coupling,  is the SU(2) gauge coupling and
 is the energy cut-off to the divergent loop integrals. As  
increases (depending on the chosen cut-off ), then  can be freely dialed so as
to maintain  at its measured value (now known to be  GeV).
By insisting on naturalness, then . 
 TeV. 
This then implies that the Standard Model as a natural effective field theory is only valid up to the 1 TeV energy scale.

Sometimes it is complained that this argument depends on the regularization scheme introducing the cut-off  
and perhaps the problem disappears under dimensional regularization. 
In this case, if new particles which couple to the Higgs are introduced, one once again regains the quadratic divergence now in terms of the new particle squared masses.
For instance, if one includes see-saw neutrinos into the Standard Model, then  would blow up to near the see-saw scale, typically expected in the  GeV range.

MSSM and the little hierarchy

Overview 

By supersymmetrizing the Standard Model, one arrives at a solution to the 
gauge hierarchy, or big hierarchy, problem in that supersymmetry guarantees 
cancellation of quadratic divergences to all orders in perturbation theory. 
The simplest supersymmetrization of the SM leads to the 
Minimal Supersymmetric Standard Model or MSSM. 
In the MSSM, each SM particle has a partner particle known as a super-partner or
sparticle. For instance, the left- and right-electron helicity components 
have scalar partner selectrons  and 
respectively whilst the eight colored gluons have eight colored spin-1/2 gluino
superpartners. The MSSM Higgs sector must necessarily be expanded to include two
rather than one doublets leading to five physical Higgs particles
 and  whilst three of the eight 
bosons to make them massive. 
The MSSM is actually 
supported by three different sets of measurements which test for the presence of 
virtual superpartners: 1. the celebrated weak scale measurements of 
the three gauge couplings strengths are just what is needed for gauge coupling 
unification at a scale  GeV, 2. the value of 
 GeV falls squarely in the range needed to trigger a radiatively-driven 
breakdown in electroweak symmetry and 
3. the measured value of 
GeV falls within the narrow window of allowed values for the MSSM.

Nonetheless, verification of weak scale SUSY (WSS, SUSY with superpartner masses at or 
around the weak scale as characterized by  GeV) requires
the direct observation of at least some of the superpartners at 
sufficiently energetic colliding beam experiments. 
As recent as 2017, the CERN Large Hadron Collider, a  collider operating at center-of-mass energy 13 TeV, 
has not found any evidence for superpartners. This has led to mass limits on the
gluino  TeV and on the lighter top squark 
 TeV (within the context of certain simplified models
which are assumed to make the experimental analysis more tractable).
Along with these limits, the rather large measured value of  GeV
seems to require TeV-scale highly mixed top squarks. 
These combined measurements have raised concern now about an emerging Little Hierarchy
Under the Little Hierarchy, one might expect the now log-divergent light Higgs mass to 
blow up to the sparticle mass scale unless one fine-tunes. The Little Hierarchy 
problem has led to concern that WSS is perhaps not realized in nature, or at least not 
in the manner typically expected by theorists in years past.

Status 

In the MSSM, the light Higgs mass is calculated to be

where the mixing and loop contributions are  but where in most 
models, the soft SUSY breaking up-Higgs mass  is driven to large,
TeV-scale negative values (in order to break electroweak symmetry). Then, to maintain
the measured value of  GeV, one must tune the superpotential
mass term  to some large positive value. 
Alternatively, for natural SUSY, one may expect that  runs to small negative values
This already leads to a prediction: since  is supersymmetric and feeds mass to both SM particles (W,Z,h) 
and superpartners (higgsinos), then it is expected
from the natural MSSM that light higgsinos exist nearby to the 100-200 GeV scale.
This simple realization has profound implications for WSS collider 
and dark matter searches.

Naturalness in the MSSM has historically been expressed in terms of the 
boson mass, and indeed this approach leads to more stringent upper bounds 
on sparticle masses. By minimizing the (Coleman-Weinberg) scalar potential of the
MSSM, then one may relate the measured value of  GeV to the
SUSY Lagrangian parameters:

Here,  is the ratio of Higgs field vacuum expectation 
mass term. The  and  contain
a variety of loop corrections labelled by indices i and j, the most important of 
which typically comes from the top-squarks.

In the renowned review work of P. Nilles, titled "Supersymmetry, Supergravity and Particle Physics", published on Phys.Rept. 110 (1984) 1-162, one finds the sentence "Experiments within the next five to ten years will enable us to decide whether supersymmetry as a solution of the naturalness problem of the weak interaction scale is a myth or a reality".

See also
 Fine-tuning
 Hierarchy problem
 Large extra dimensions
 Split supersymmetry
 Weak gravity conjecture

References

Further reading 

 Sabine Hossenfelder (2018). Lost in Math: How Beauty Leads Physics Astray, Basic Books.
 Burton Richter, Is "naturalness" unnatural? Invited talk presented at SUSY06: 14th International Conference On Supersymmetry And The Unification Of Fundamental Interactions 6/12/2006—6/17/2006

Particle physics